Swan Ponds is a historic plantation house located near Morganton, Burke County, North Carolina. It was built in 1848, and is a two-story, three bay, brick mansion with a low hip roof in the Greek Revival style. It features a one-story low hip-roof porch with bracketed eaves, a low pedimented central pavilion, and square columns. Swan Ponds plantation was the home of Waightstill Avery (1741–1821), an early American lawyer and soldier. His son Isaac Thomas Avery built the present Swan Ponds dwelling. Swan Ponds was the birthplace of North Carolina politician and lawyer William Waightstill Avery (1816–1864), Clarke Moulton Avery owner of Magnolia Place, and Confederate States Army officer Isaac E. Avery (1828–1863).

It was listed on the National Register of Historic Places in 1973.

References

Plantation houses in North Carolina
Houses on the National Register of Historic Places in North Carolina
Greek Revival houses in North Carolina
Houses completed in 1848
Houses in Burke County, North Carolina
National Register of Historic Places in Burke County, North Carolina